Addi Gela is a reservoir located in the Hintalo Wajirat woreda of the Tigray Region in Ethiopia. The earthen dam that holds the reservoir was built in 1998 by SAERT.

Dam characteristics 
 Dam height: 22 metres
 Dam crest length: 424 metres
 Spillway width: 14 metres

Capacity 
 Original capacity: 1 250 000 m³
 Dead storage: 62 500 m³
 Reservoir area: 18.5 ha
In 2002, the life expectancy of the reservoir (the duration before it is filled with sediment) was estimated at 40 years.

Irrigation 
 Designed irrigated area: 100 ha
 Actual irrigated area in 2002: 6 ha

Environment 
The catchment of the reservoir is 8.19 km2 large, with a perimeter of 13.43 km and a length of 5640 metres. The reservoir suffers from rapid siltation. The lithology of the catchment is Agula Shale, Mekelle Dolerite, and sandstone of the Amba Aradam Formation. Part of the water that could be used for irrigation is lost through seepage; the positive side-effect is that this contributes to groundwater recharge.

References 

1998 establishments in Ethiopia
Reservoirs in Ethiopia
Tigray Region